Frank A. McClintock (January 2, 1921 – February 20, 2011) of Concord, Massachusetts, was an American mechanical engineer in material science. A pioneer in the study of ductile fracture, McClintock was an Emeritus professor in the Department of Mechanical Engineering at Massachusetts Institute of Technology.

Along with Ali S. Argon in 1966 he co-authored a book titled Mechanical Behavior of Materials.

"His professional contributions revolutionized the understanding of the fracture process in engineering practice, by introducing a physical and mechanistic perspective emphasizing the plasticity aspects of ductile fracture and fatigue crack propagation."

References

1921 births
2011 deaths
American engineers
MIT School of Humanities, Arts, and Social Sciences faculty
Massachusetts Institute of Technology alumni
California Institute of Technology alumni
People from Saint Paul, Minnesota